Rushworth and Dreaper was a firm of organ builders, and later general instrument suppliers associated with Paul McCartney based in Liverpool. The manufacturer was founded in 1828 by William Rushworth, operating until 2002. Upon its liquidation, its archives were mostly destroyed, and the Victorian clock in the works tower was removed. The premises are now occupied by Henry Willis & Sons.

Organs built by the company (in date order)

St Oswald's Church, Winwick, 1838.
All Saints' Church, Bradbourne Derbyshire 1866
St Mary's Church, Knowsley, 1913.
Liverpool Collegiate School, 1913.
Eastcliffe Congregational Church, Bournemouth, 1914.
Our Lady & St Alphege, Bath, 1915.
St Anne's Church, Stanley, 1916
St Barnabas' Church, Bromborough, 1923.
St Hildeburgh's Church, Hoylake, 1924 (?)
St Andrew's Church, West Kirby, 1925.
St. Laurence and All Saints Church, Eastwood, Essex, 1925
St Michael's & All Angels Church, Windmill Hill, Bedminster, Bristol, 1927 - Opening recital by Mr W. Maynard Rushworth.
Malvern Priory, 1927.
Stowe School Chapel, 1928.
The Queen's College, Oxford, 1931.
Christ's Hospital School chapel, Horsham, 1931.
St Marys Church, Northop Hall, 1931
Manchester Grammar School, 1931
Howden Minster, East Riding of Yorkshire, 1933.
All Hallows Church, Whitchurch, Hampshire, 1935
St. Margaret's Church, Aspley, 1936.
St. Cuthberts Church Brislington Bristol, 1937.
St. Michael and All Angels Church, Bassett, Hampshire, 1937.
Holy Cross Church, Woodchurch, 1938.
St John's Church, Wainfelin, 1938.
Church of the Holy Rude, Stirling 1940.
All Saints Church, Clifton, Bristol, 1946 (the previous organ built by "Harrison & Harrison" was destroyed by German bombing in 1940).
St Peter's Church, Heswall, 1947.
Heathfield Road Welsh Presbyterian Church Liverpool - largely demolished 2011 Installed by Rushworth & Dreaper in 1950. Dismantled November 2010 by Jardines for a private owner and moved in several lorries to another former Welsh Presbyterian chapel in Mid Wales for restoration along with some contemporary contents from the since demolished Liverpool Church. Evidence uncovered by Jardines and new owner indicates that this tubular pneumatic instrument was probably rebuilt from a much earlier 19th-century Hope-Jones Organ. There are traces of some tracking, the feet and detail of the wooden pipes are typical of Hope-Jones and have the same paint colours as Hope-Jones examples observed elsewhere. Several cast iron weights from the regulators are cast with the words HOPE JONES and two others have N & L (?) castings. More details on National Pipe Organ Register.
Royal Memorial Chapel, Royal Military Academy Sandhurst 1950
Christ Church Thornton le Fylde 1950
Stockport Grammar School, 1951. ("The Stopfordian", December 1951 (X, 25) pp. 27–28.)
The Great Hall, Goldsmiths College, London.
St Saviour's Church, Oxton.
Liverpool Parish church - our lady and St Nicholas 1952
St Michael's Church, Blundellsands, Liverpool 1952
 St Catherine's Church, Westonbirt, 1953
Albion Congregational Church, 1953
St Mark's Church, Bromley, 1954.
St Mary the Virgin, Hennock, Devon, 1954.
Tyndale Baptist, Clifton, Bristol, 1956. 6 Ranks Extension - Fully enclosed in 2 boxes - Detached tab console. More details on National Pipe Organ Register.
St Andrew's Church, Plymouth, 1957.
St.Martin's Baguley, Manchester, 1960.
Guildford Cathedral, 1961.
Liverpool Philharmonic Hall, 1961.
St John the Evangelist RC Church, Portobello, 1961
Victoria Hall, Halifax, 1963 (rebuild of 1901 William Hill instrument
Avenue Methodist Church, Sale, 1963 - 4 unit extension organ.
St Michael and All Angels Church, Hawkshead, Cumbria. 1965.
Ealing Abbey, St Benedic's School, London 1967.
 Cathedral of Our Lady Assumed into Heaven and Saint Nicholas (Galway Cathedral), Galway, Republic of Ireland, 1966
Keele University, chapel, 1966
 Church of the Ascension, Kenton, Newcastle upon Tyne, 1966
 Leeds Trinity University Chapel, Horsforth, 1968
 Allerton Presbyterian Church (now Allerton United Reformed Church), Liverpool, c.1969
St Mary's Church, Mold, 1972.
Holy Trinity Brompton Church, London, 1974 (formerly the organ was at St. Mark's Church, North Audley Street, London).
Parish of St Benedict Ealing Abbey, London, 1974.
The Chapel of the Resurrection, University of Ibadan, Ibadan, Nigeria 1978
Hoarse Memorial Methodist Cathedral, Yaba, Lagos, Nigeria 1978
The Cathedral of St David, Kudeti, Ibadan, Nigeria 1984
Chapel of Liverpool Blue Coat School (1906)
Chapel of Wrekin College, Wellington 1937

References

External links
 Rushworth and Dreaper (Dave Nicholas - Cinema organist)
Dave Nicholas Interview NAMM Oral History Library (2020)

Listen:
R & D 2-manual organ (Demonstration on YouTube)

Pipe organ building companies
Organ builders of the United Kingdom
Manufacturing companies based in Liverpool
Manufacturing companies established in 1828
Companies disestablished in 2002
Musical instrument manufacturing companies of the United Kingdom
Retail companies of the United Kingdom